At Home With the Groovebox is a 1999 compilation album released on Grand Royal records. All of the artists composed their tracks using the Roland MC-505 Groovebox, an all-in-one music production device intended for techno and dance music.

Track listing

Jean-Jacques Perrey - "The Groovy Leprechauns"	
Buffalo Daughter - "303 + 606 = ACID"	
John McEntire - "J.I.H.A.D."	
Air - "Planet Vega"	
Pavement - "Robyn Turns 26"	
Money Mark - "Insects Are All Around Us"	
Beck - "Boyz"	
Sean Lennon - "Winged Elephants"	
Gershon Kingsley - "Popcorn"	
Sonic Youth - "Campfire"	
Bis - "Oh My"	
Cibo Matto - "We Love Our Lawyers"	
Bonnie "Prince" Billy - "Today I Am Celebrating Again"	
Dick Hyman - "Glass Slipper"	
Pavement - "Watch Out"
Gershon Kingsley - "Popcorn Instrumental"

See also 

 List of Grand Royal artists

References

1999 compilation albums
Grand Royal compilation albums